Imperial is that which relates to an empire, emperor/empress, or imperialism.

Imperial or The Imperial may also refer to:

Places

United States
 Imperial, California
 Imperial, Missouri
 Imperial, Nebraska
 Imperial, Pennsylvania
 Imperial, Texas
 Imperial, West Virginia
 Imperial, Virginia
 Imperial County, California
 Imperial Valley, California
 Imperial Beach, California

Elsewhere
 Imperial (Madrid), an administrative neighborhood in Spain
 Imperial, Saskatchewan, a town in Canada

Buildings
 Imperial Apartments, a building in Brooklyn, New York
 Imperial City, Huế, a palace in Huế, Vietnam
 Imperial Palace (disambiguation)
 Imperial Towers, a group of lighthouses on Lake Huron, Canada
 The Imperial (Mumbai), a skyscraper apartment complex in India

Animals and plants
 Cheritra or imperial, a genus of butterfly

Architecture, design, and fashion
 Imperial, a luggage case for the top of a coach
 Imperial, the top, roof or second-storey compartment of a coach or carriage, especially a stagecoach
 Imperial, a style of moustache
 Imperial staircase, a style of staircase

Arts, entertainment, and media

Fictional entities
 Imperial, a megacorporation in Mutant Chronicles
 Imperial, several entities in the Galactic Empire (Star Wars)
Imperial (Elder Scrolls), a fictional race in The Elder Scrolls series of video games

Games
 Imperial (board game), a German-style board game by Mac Gerdts

Literature
 Imperial (book), a 2009 book by William T. Vollmann
 Imperial (comics), a story arc from New X-Men

Music

Groups and labels
 Imperial Records, an American record company
 Little Anthony and the Imperials, an American doo-wop vocal group
 The Imperials, a vocal group
 Imperial (band), an American metalcore band

Albums
 Imperial (Denzel Curry album), 2016
 Imperial (In Fear and Faith album), 2010
 Imperial, by Robin Guthrie, 2003
 The Imperial (The Delines album), 2019
 The Imperial (Flipmode Squad album), 1998
 Imperial, by Soen, 2021

Songs
 "Imperial", a song by HammerFall from the 2005 album Chapter V: Unbent, Unbowed, Unbroken
 "Imperial", a song by Momus from his 2016 album Scobberlotchers
 "Imperial", a song by Rah Digga from the 2000 album Dirty Harriet
 "Imperial", a song by Strapping Young Lad from the 2005 album Alien

Brands and enterprises

Beverages and foods
 Imperial (beer), a Costa Rican brand of beer
 Mint imperial, a type of candy

Hotels
 Hotel Imperial, a hotel in Vienna, Austria
 Imperial Hotel (disambiguation)
 The Imperial, New Delhi, a hotel in India

Transportation
 Chrysler Imperial, a car built 1926–1954 and after 1990
 Imperial (automobile), a marque used by Chrysler 1955–1983
 Imperial (British automobile), three separate British makes of car
 Imperial (SP train), a night train of the Rock Island Rail Road and the Southern Pacific
 Imperial Limited, a night train of the Canadian Pacific Railway
 Imperial Air Cargo, a South African cargo airline
 Imperial Airlines, a United States commuter airline
 Imperial Airport, an airport in Saskatchewan, Canada
 Imperial Automobile Company, an American automaker 1908–1916

Other brands and enterprises
 Imperial Bank Limited, a commercial bank in Kenya
 Imperial Oil, a Canadian company
 Imperial Productions, a London theatre company
 Imperial Theater (disambiguation)
 Imperial Tobacco, a British multinational company
 Imperial Typewriter Company, a British manufacturer

Organizations

Education
 Imperial College London, an English university
 Imperial Academy (Ethiopia), the national academy of Ethiopia
 Imperial Valley College, an American community college in Imperial County, California

Government and politics
 Indian Civil Service (British India), a British rule in India

Sports
 Imperial Esports, a Brazilian esports organization
 Imperials Football Club, a defunct Australian rules football club
 Imperial Futebol Clube, a Brazilian football (soccer) club

People 
 Athena Imperial (born 1987), Filipina news reporter, communication researcher and beauty queen
 Barbie Imperial (born 1998), Filipina actress and model
 Carlos Eduardo Imperial (1935–1992), Brazilian actor, filmmaker, presenter, songwriter and music producer
 Carlos R. Imperial (1930–2010), Filipino politician
 Dino Imperial (born 1988), Filipino actor, club MC, model and radio disk jockey
 Francisco Imperial, 15th-century Genoese poet in Seville

Standards and types
 Imperial, a traditional paper size, 22 x 30 inches
 Imperial, a wine bottle nomenclature for a one-gallon bottle size
 Imperial purple, a reddish-purple natural dye
 Imperial units, a measurement system used in the UK and Commonwealth of Nations

See also
 Imperial Court (disambiguation)
 Imperial River (disambiguation)
 Imperial Seal (disambiguation)
 Imperial University (disambiguation)